The 1973 Macdonald Brier, the Canadian men's national curling championship was held from March 5 to 11, 1973 at the Klondike Gardens in Edmonton, Alberta. The total attendance for the week was 37,575.

The event was memorable for having particularly bad ice conditions, considered by some as the "worst (Brier ice) ever manufactured". There was a great thickness of frost on the ice, which was also dotted by tiny pools of water.

Despite not being considered favorites, Team Saskatchewan, who was skipped by Harvey Mazinke adapted best to the poor ice conditions and captured the Brier tankard as they finished round robin play with a 9–1 record. This was Saskatchewan's sixth Brier title overall and the only title that Mazinke skipped. 

Mazinke's rink would go onto represent Canada in the 1973 Air Canada Silver Broom, the men's world curling championship on home soil in Regina, Saskatchewan where they won the silver medal.

This was the first Brier in which teams were allowed to concede games before all ends were complete as long as ten ends were played.

Saskatchewan's 7–5 victory over Manitoba in Draw 5 was the fourth time in Brier history in which a game went into a second extra end.

The Draw 7 matchup between New Brunswick and Northern Ontario saw five consecutive blank ends beginning in the fourth end, setting a then Brier record for most consecutive blank ends in one game. This remains a Macdonald era record (until ) and wouldn't be broken in any Brier until .

Teams
The teams were listed as follows:

Round Robin standings

Round Robin Results

All draw times are listed in Mountain Standard Time (UTC-07:00).

Draw 1
Monday, March 5, 2:30 pm

Draw 2
Monday, March 5, 7:30 pm

Draw 3
Tuesday, March 6, 9:00 am

Draw 4
Tuesday, March 6, 2:00 pm

Draw 5
Wednesday, March 7, 2:00 pm

Draw 6
Wednesday, March 7, 7:30 pm

Draw 7
Thursday, March 8, 2:00 pm

Draw 8
Thursday, March 8, 7:30 pm

Draw 9
Friday, March 9, 2:00 pm

Draw 10
Friday, March 9, 7:30 pm

Draw 11
Saturday, March 10, 11:00 am

Awards

All-Star Team 
The media selected the following curlers as All-Stars.

Ross G.L. Harstone Award
The Ross Harstone Award was presented to the player chosen by their fellow peers as the curler who best represented Harstone's high ideals of good sportsmanship, observance of the rules, exemplary conduct and curling ability.

References

External links
- Soudog Curling
Curling Canada Youtube video
CurlingZone Coverage

1973 in Canadian curling
1973
Curling competitions in Edmonton
1973 in Alberta